Noah's Ark (The Ark in the original English-Spanish version) is a 2007 Argentine-Italian animated comedy adventure film directed by Juan Pablo Buscarini. Based on the biblical story of Noah's Ark, its story is told from the animals' point of view. The film tends to follow the traditional story, with the animals anthropomorphic beings.

Plot

Animals and humans personify the seven deadly sins: pride (the peacock), envy (the snake), sloth (the sloth), lust (the hedgehog), gluttony (the toad), wrath (the mandrill), and greed (the human). This results in their doom as they are killed or captured and taken to market (where the killed animals are sold and survivors are enslaved). God sees the market and its evils, and tells an angel that he will destroy the world. An encounter with gentle, devoted Noah, who purchases the freedom of an enslaved man despite his own poverty, convinces him to give humanity one last chance.

God appears as a heavenly light to Noah, telling him to build a large ark for his family and two of every animal to survive a flood. Noah tells his family, who thinks he is crazy.
He sells his home for a flock of pigeons to deliver messages to all the animals, but all the pigeons except one (Pepe) fail in the mission. Pepe is rescued from attacking animals by the kind lioness Kairel, secretary for the aging King Sabu and Queen Oriana. Kairel delivers Noah's message to Sabu, who calls an emergency meeting of the animal. Sabu's spoiled son, Xiro, misinterprets Noah's message as an invitation to a cruise. Xiro is angry when Kairel disqualifies his cruise guests, and the tiger Dagnino hopes to rule the post-flood world's animal kingdom.

Noah finishes the ark (which resembles a cruise ship), and the animals arrive. Kairel has been sent to organize and supervise the trip, but the herbivores demand assurance that the carnivores will not eat them once they're aboard. Dagnino says that he will punish any act of violence on the voyage. It begins raining, and the animals stampede onto the ark. Xiro grabs Kairel and brings her aboard the ark.

Farfan and Esther, who bought Noah's cottage, see the ark in the distance. Panicking as the water rises around them, they scramble onto the ark. Kairel tries to maintain order and convince Xiro to take his duties seriously, but Xiro flees to a club. He becomes infatuated with the dancing panther Panthy, part of Dagnino's cabal of carnivores who intend to rule the prey species.

Xiro faces the situation and tries to govern. He grows closer to Kairel, but is still infatuated with Panthy. Below deck with the animals, Farfan and Esther disguise themselves as a fictional "grasswhopper" species to avoid discovery. Under a pile of dung hauled to the deck for disposal, Farfan and Esther (chased by Noah) Noah fall into the depths of the ark. Noah's eldest son, Japeth, volunteers to rescue him; the injured Pepe cannot fly. Noah's sons break the helm.

Farfan and Esther knock Noah unconscious and abandon him. Farfan bullies the smaller animals and hits Dagnino, who tears off the lower half of his disguise. Panthy lures Xiro to her cabin, where Dagnino's minions use the disguise and tomato juice to frame Xiro for the murder of the grasswhoppers. Dagnino has Xiro locked in a storeroom, but Xiro's herbivore friends convince Kairel of the truth.

Noah regains consciousness and tends to Pepe before sending him out a porthole to find land. Xiro's friends free him and he confronts Dagnino, who has captured the other herbivores. Their battle ends when the ark, having drifted into the Arctic, hits an ice floe.

The animals panic again, threatening to flee until Xiro rallies them. Noah has returned to his family on deck, and they begin repairing the helm. God allows the angel to stop the rain. Xiro realizes that the pitch for the ship's torches will melt the ice, and the animals spread barrels of it across the floe. Xiro lights the pitch, freeing the ark. Farfan and Esther, believing the ark has run aground, fall onto the floe as the ark departs; they flee the hungry polar bears, who are remaining in their natural habitat.

Pepe returns to the ark with an olive leaf. Xiro and Kairel reconcile as the animals (including a caged Panthy and Dagnino's gang, stuck in a wall) celebrate on the deck. God enjoys the festivities, but admonishes the angel for leaving the rainbow on; they bicker about God's work in progress.

English-language cast
Rob Van Paulus as God, an African man with blond hair
Andrio Chavarro as Angel, God's aide, who does his work (including writing his book, and asking him for advice)
Joe Carey as Noah, with a long grey-and-white beard, glasses and simple maroon clothes
Kay Brady as Naamah, Noah's wife, who tries to keep her family together,
Andrio Chavarro as Japheth, Noah's oldest child; heavy-set with red hair, a beard and blue clothes
Brandon Morris as Ham, Noah's middle child and his only African one, with a large black Afro and red clothes
Lissa Grossman as Miriam, one of Noah's daughters-in-law, who is married to Ham. She has red hair and blue clothes.
Loren Lusch as Sara, another of Noah's daughters-in-law, who is married to Shem; she has dark hair and wears white clothes.
Aubrey Shavonn as Edith, the last of Noah's daughters-in-law, who is married to Japeth. She has blonde hair and wears red clothes.
Terrell Hardcastle as Pepe, a white dove
Oscar Cheda as King Sabu, An elderly lion who gives up his place on the ark
Heidi Harris as Queen Oriana, the wife of King Sabu and queen of the animals before the flood. Harris also voiced Bruma, a lioness and a minor antagonist
James Keller as Xiro, the main protagonist and the son of King Sabu and Queen Oriana. Although he is a predator, he is friends with herbivores. Keller also voiced Farfan, a bald con artist with green skin.
Tom Wahl as Bombay, an orangutan who is Xiro's spiritual guide and wears a pink bow
Chloe Dolandis as Kairel, a lioness who is an aide to Queen Orianna and has a crush on Xiro
Antonio Amadeo as Pity The Parrot, an entertainer on the ark, with green feathers and a loud voice
Wayne LeGette as Dagnino, a tiger who conspires to become king of the beasts
Danny Paul as Coco, a crocodile who is Dagnino's enforcer
Todd Allen Durkin as Patricio, a vulture who sits on Coco's shoulder
Gerald Owens as Cachito, a puma
Barry Tarallo as Wolfgang, a wolf who cares about Xiro
Heather Gallagher as Panthy, a black panther who is the only female animal mutineer
Rayner Grannchen as Alvaro, a brave pig who becomes friends with Xiro
Amy London as Esther, the other con artist, with red hair and earrings
Deborah Sherman Gorelo as Lily, an orangutan and Bombay's mate, with shaggy dark fur

Additional voices
Rusty Allison
Robin Barson 
David Driesin
John Felix
Christy Hardcastle
David K. Wait
Josh Wetherington
Stacey Schwartz
David Steel

Spanish-language cast 
 Juan Carlos Mesa as Noé
 Jorge Guinzburg as Farfan
 Mariana Fabbiani as Miriam 
 Alejandro Fantino as Jafet 
 Magdalena Ruiz Guiñazú as Reina Leona Oriana 
 Lalo Mir as Pity
 Alejandro Dolina as Puma Cachito
 Diego Topa as Palomo Pepe

Home media
Noah's Ark was released on DVD in the United States by Shout! Factory on March 11, 2014, with an English track and a Spanish audio track with English subtitles. It omits several scenes from the original 2007 film., mainly the scenes that were less appropriate for young children.

References

External links
 
 Excerpt on YouTube
 Trailer

2007 films
Argentine animated films
Italian animated films
Censored films
2000s Spanish-language films
Noah's Ark in film
Spanish animated films
2007 animated films
Films distributed by Disney
Seven deadly sins in popular culture
2000s Argentine films